The Yorkshire Premier League North was formed in early 2016 following the re-structure of club cricket within Yorkshire, and is an ECB Premier League. Of the initial twelve competing teams, six were from the now disbanded Yorkshire ECB County Premier League - Castleford, Driffield Town, Harrogate, Hull, York, and Yorkshire CCC Academy. The other six teams were from the York & District Senior Cricket League - Acomb, Dunnington, Scarborough, Sheriff Hutton Bridge, Stamford Bridge, and Woodhouse Grange. The League headquarters is based in Sowerby, Thirsk.

A process of promotion and relegation is in operation with the bottom two teams being replaced each season by the top two teams from the York & District Senior Cricket League. A 50 over knockout competition is also competed for in conjunction with the Yorkshire South Premier League. Teams also compete in a T20 tournament, and there is also an U19 T20 for younger players.

The league winners qualify to take part in the Yorkshire Championship, together with the winners of the Bradford Premier League and the Yorkshire South Premier League, and the leading Yorkshire club in the North Yorkshire and South Durham Cricket League.

Winners

Performance by season from 2016

2022 Top Two Division Teams

Premier Division 
 Acomb
 Beverley Town 
 Castleford
 Clifton Alliance
 Driffield Town 
 Harrogate
 Scarborough
 Sessay
 Sheriff Hutton Bridge
 Woodhouse Grange
 York

Championship 
 Bridlington
 Carlton Towers
 Cottingham 
 Easingwold
 Folkton & Flixton 
 Hull Zingari
 Malton & Old Malton
 Pickering
 Stamford Bridge
 Welton
 Whitkirk
 York 2nd XI

References

External links
 Official website
 Play-cricket website

Cricket competitions in Yorkshire
ECB Premier Leagues
English domestic cricket competitions
Cricket in North Yorkshire
Club cricket